Aconitum heterophyllum, also called atish/atis/patis/ativish/atvika, is a species of flowering plant in the genus Aconitum. It is used in Indian systems of traditional medicine including Ayurveda.

Available in the slopes in sub alpine and alpine areas between 2500- 3500m. Jammu & Kashmir, Himachal Pradesh and Uttarakhand. Pakistan and Nepal.

Medicinal Use : Roots are used to cure dysentery, diarrhea, fever, malarial fever, cough, cold colic, headache, piles, hysteria, throat infection, cure for dyspepsia, especially when appetite is lost after illness and also in vomiting, abdominal pain and diabetes. It also checks excessive menstrual flow. Fresh leaves used to cure toothache.

References

Further reading 
 
 Aconitum heterophyllum Wallich [Cat. 167, no. 4722. 1831,nom.nud.] ex Royle, Illus. Bot. Himal. t.13. 1833 & 56. 1834; Rau in B.D.Sharma & al., Fl. India 1: 15.1993.
 

heterophyllum